Calcium/calmodulin-dependent protein kinase kinase 1 is an enzyme that in humans is encoded by the CAMKK1 gene.

The product of this gene belongs to the serine/threonine protein kinase family, and to the Ca(2+)/calmodulin-dependent protein kinase (CAMK) subfamily. This protein plays a role in the calcium/calmodulin-dependent (CaM) kinase cascade. Three transcript variants encoding two distinct isoforms have been identified for this gene.

References

External links

Further reading